Malcolm Lange (born 22 November 1973) is a South African former professional racing cyclist. He won the South African National Road Race Championships on three occasions. He also rode in two events at the 1992 Summer Olympics.

Major results

1991
 1st Amashova Durban Classic
1995
 1st  Road race, National Road Championships
 1st Amashova Durban Classic
 2nd Grand Prix Criquielion
1997
 1st  Time trial, National Road Championships
1998
 National Road Championships
1st  Time trial
3rd Road race
 1st Amashova Durban Classic
 1st Prologue & Stage 5 Giro del Capo
1999
 1st  Road race, National Road Championships
 1st Stage 1 Rapport Toer
 2nd  Road race, All-Africa Games
2000
 1st Stages 1 & 3 Giro del Capo
 3rd Overall Tour of South China Sea
1st Stages 5 & 7
2001
 1st Amashova Durban Classic
 4th Road race, National Road Championships
2002
 1st Amashova Durban Classic
2003
 1st  Road race, All-Africa Games
 2nd Road race, National Road Championships
2004
 Tour de Tunisie
1st Points classification
1st Stages 2, 6 & 10
2006
 1st Stage 1 Giro del Capo
2007
 1st  Road race, National Road Championships
 5th Overall Tour du Maroc
1st Stages 6, 7 & 8
 5th Powerade Dome 2 Dome Cycling Spectacular
2008
 1st Amashovashova National Classic
 2nd Powerade Dome 2 Dome Cycling Spectacular
 7th Overall Tour du Maroc
1st Stages 3, 5 & 8
 8th Overall La Tropicale Amissa Bongo
2010
 1st Emirates Cup
 2nd Tour de Delhi
 2nd H. H. Vice-President's Cup
 5th Overall Jelajah Malaysia
1st Stage 3
2010
 6th Tour de Mumbai II
 8th Tour de Mumbai I

References

External links
 

1973 births
Living people
South African male cyclists
Cyclists from Johannesburg
Olympic cyclists of South Africa
Cyclists at the 1992 Summer Olympics
White South African people
20th-century South African people
21st-century South African people